Çorluspor 1947 is a Turkish football club based in Çorlu. The club became champion in Tekirdağ Super Amateur League and was promoted to Turkish Regional Amateur League.

History
Çorluspor 1947 was founded as "Doğanspor" with black and white colours. In 1961 name was changed to "Çorluspor" and colours were changed to red and yellow.

References

Football clubs in Turkey